Ivars de Noguera (Officially and in Catalan) is a municipality in the comarca of the Noguera in Catalonia, Spain. It is situated on the left bank of the Noguera Ribagorçana river below the Santa Anna reservoir. The village is served by the L-903 road, which joins the C-148 road to Balaguer.

Demography

References

 Panareda Clopés, Josep Maria; Rios Calvet, Jaume; Rabella Vives, Josep Maria (1989). Guia de Catalunya, Barcelona: Caixa de Catalunya.  (Spanish).  (Catalan).

External links 
Official website 
 Government data pages 

Municipalities in Noguera (comarca)
Populated places in Noguera (comarca)